Until It's Time for You to Go is an album by the jazz saxophonist Rusty Bryant, recorded for the Prestige label in 1974.

Reception

The Allmusic site awarded the album 3 stars stating "Until It's Time for You to Go is an album of tasteful commercialism... This is not an album of wimpy elevator Muzak; whether he is on alto or tenor, Bryant's playing is gutsy and substantial. And even if some of the material is over-arranged, Bryant still gets in his share of meaty solos. Not everything that Bryant recorded in the '70s was great, but Until It's Time for You to Go is among the late saxman's more memorable albums of that era".

Track listing
All compositions by Horace Ott except as indicated
 "The Hump Bump" - 5:56 
 "Troubles" (Rev. Leroy Jenkins) - 4:32  
 "Red Eye Special" - 7:23 
 "Draggin' the Line" (Tommy James, Bob King) - 5:22  
 "Until It's Time for You to Go" (Buffy Sainte-Marie) - 5:33  
 "Ga Gang Gang Goong" (Ernie Hayes, Rusty Bryant) - 5:30

Personnel
Rusty Bryant - alto saxophone, tenor saxophone
Jon Faddis, Joe Shepley - trumpet
Billy Campbell, Garnett Brown - trombone
Seldon Powell - flute, tenor saxophone
Haywood Henry - flute, baritone saxophone
Babe Clark - baritone saxophone
George Devens - vibraphone, percussion
Horace Ott - piano, clavinet, electric piano, arranger, conductor
Ernie Hayes - organ
Hugh McCracken, David Spinozza - guitar
Wilbur Bascomb - electric bass
Bernard Purdie - drums

Production
 Bob Porter - producer
 Don Hahn - engineer

References

Rusty Bryant albums
1974 albums
Prestige Records albums
Albums arranged by Horace Ott
Albums produced by Bob Porter (record producer)